Erick Tsang Kwok-wai  (born 1 September 1963) is a Hong Kong government official. Since 2020, he has been Secretary for Constitutional and Mainland Affairs, one of the principal officials of Hong Kong. Prior to that, he was Director of Immigration.

Biography
Tsang joined the Immigration Department in 1987 and rose through the ranks to Principal Immigration Officer in 2009. He was Assistant Secretary for Security from 2003 to 2006. In 2012, he became Assistant Director of Immigration and then in 2014, Deputy Director of Immigration. In April 2016, he was appointed Director of Immigration.

In April 2020, State Council of the People's Republic of China appointed Tsang Secretary for Constitutional and Mainland Affairs, replacing Patrick Nip, days after the department had failed to reflect Beijing's controversially changed position on the status of the Liaison Office under Hong Kong's Basic Law. He also drew criticism for a prominently positioned photograph of Chinese Communist Party general secretary Xi Jinping in his office.

In August 2020, Tsang and ten other officials were sanctioned by the United States Department of the Treasury under Executive Order 13936 by President Trump for undermining Hong Kong's autonomy.

On October 14, 2020, the United States Department of State released a report on 10 individuals who materially contributed to the failure of the China to meet its obligations under the Sino–British Joint Declaration and Hong Kong's Basic Law. Tsang was on the list.

In September 2020, when pro-democracy organizers planned to hold primaries for the 2020 Legislative Council, Tsang said that candidates could be in breach of the National Security Law.

On 25 November 2020, Tsang was spotted sleeping during Chief Executive Carrie Lam's annual Policy Address. At a press conference two days later, Tsang claimed that medication he took caused the drowsiness.

In January 2021, Tsang commented on forcing district councillors to take an oath to pledge loyalty to the government, and said that under the National Security Law, this would be required. After the arrest of 53 pro-democracy figures in January 2021, Tsang said that they had to pay the price for "crossing the red line" by organizing primaries for the Legislative Council.

In February 2021, Tsang announced that under the government's plan to mandate district councillors take an oath of loyalty to the government, four pro-democracy district councillors (Lester Shum, Tiffany Yuen, Fergus Leung and Tat Cheng) would lose their seats. In response, Shum said that the government was crushing dissent. Also in February 2021, Tsang said "You cannot say that you are patriotic but you do not love the leadership of the Chinese Communist Party or you do not respect it - this does not make sense." In addition, on the potential changes to the electoral system from Beijing, Tsang said that "When the central government reaches a concrete decision, we will fully cooperate." In March 2021, Tsang officially introduced the bill that would force district councillors to take an oath, stating that he would like it "passed as soon as possible."

In March 2021, Tsang announced a publicity drive for the legislation that would only allow "patriots" to serve in the government, stating that "The Hong Kong government welcomes and supports the reforms," and that "We have planned for a full-scale programme of explanation, and the entire team of principal officials will participate in promoting this." In less than two weeks, approximately HK $2.5 million was spent on creating some promotional videos.

In April 2021, Tsang, along with Teresa Cheng, announced that the government would be looking into the possibility of banning blank ballots; in response, HKU Professor Johannes Chan Man-mun said that "You can't force people to vote for a particular person, or prevent people from voting for that person, or bar them from performing certain voting acts." Also in April 2021, Tsang defended a proposal that would give the Secretary of Justice the power to suspend lawmakers.

In December 2021, Tsang threatened The Wall Street Journal, after it published an editorial about the upcoming elections in Hong Kong. Tsang said that convincing people to cast blank ballots is illegal "irrespective whether the incitement is made in Hong Kong or abroad. We reserve the right to take necessary action."

In April 2022, Tsang downplayed the record-low turnout of 30.2% in the 2021 Legislative Council elections and said that people should not only look at figures to judge the election.

In July 2022, when asked about changes that would only allow "patriots" to run for office, Tsang claimed that "In fact, democracy has taken a quantum leap forward since the return to the motherland in 1997." Tsang also said that "rest assured that the ultimate aim of attaining universal suffrage... remains unchanged."

In October 2022, Tsang said that the policy of requiring only "patriots" to serve in the government may be expanded from the current policy of requiring civil servants, District Council members, as well as government schoolteachers to pledge loyalty to the government, to also include key employees in statutory bodies and public utilities in the future.

Personal life
In October 2021, Tsang's wife Louise Ho Pui-shan, born 1968, became Commissioner of Customs and Excise of Hong Kong, after a three-decade career in the service, while her younger sister Doris Ho Pui-ling - Tsang's sister-in-law - has since January 2021 headed up the government's Policy Innovation and Co-ordination Office.

In June 2022, Tsang tested positive for COVID-19. Tsang's wife was deemed a close contact, and underwent mandatory quarantine. In July 2022, she was put in quarantine again due to being a close contact with an infected colleague.

References

Living people
1963 births
Government officials of Hong Kong
Hong Kong civil servants
Members of the Executive Council of Hong Kong
Individuals sanctioned by the United States under the Hong Kong Autonomy Act
Specially Designated Nationals and Blocked Persons List